Candler is a surname. Notable people with the surname include:

Allen D. Candler, governor of Georgia (U.S. state) at the turn of the 20th century
Asa Griggs Candler, founder of the Coca-Cola Company and mayor of Atlanta
Asa G. Candler Jr., American businessman and real-estate developer
Ezekiel S. Candler Jr., American politician
John S. Candler (1861-1941), American Judge and Colonel
John W. Candler, American politician
Kat Candler, American independent filmmaker
Milton A. Candler, American politician & lawyer; brother of Asa Griggs Candler
Warren Akin Candler, American Bishop of the Methodist Episcopal Church, South; brother of Asa Griggs Candler